Kenneth Kit Lamug (born 1978 in Manila, Philippines) is an American author, illustrator, photographer and filmmaker. He is best known for his children's picture book A Box Story, co-creator of the independent film Vegasland, and his work on street photography . For his illustrative work, he is also known under the moniker Rabbleboy.

Early life and background
Lamug grew up in Manila, Philippines. He went to San Sebastian College – Recoletos de Manila graduating in 1995. He moved to Las Vegas, Nevada USA in 1996 with his parents and siblings.

Film
In 2006, Lamug co-wrote and co-directed with Thomas Vosicky the 45-minute underground film Bounce. The duo would meet again in 2008 to co-create and direct the independent film Vegasland.

Photography
During his time-off from film, Lamug documented candid portraits of strangers through his street photography series. Some of his recognitions include the 2011 ThinkArt Best of Show "Black and White Night", a feature in the 2010 National Public Radio : 100 Words series, 2010 Above Second Gallery Hong Kong Booooooom.com exhibit, as well as a finalist for the Photographers Forum "Best of Photography" competition.

Publishing
Lamug is a continuing contributor for Underneath The Juniper Tree, a macabre art and literature magazine for children. He also authored the picture book "A Box Story" (2012), which has won the 2012 Moonbeam Children's Book Awards, 2012 Pinnacle Book Awards, 2012 Literary Classic Book Awards and the 2012 National Indie Excellence Book Awards Finalist.

In 2013, Lamug was selected as a contributing artist for Tales from Lost Vegas, a comic published by Pop! Goes the Icon. The project was funded through the crowd-funding site, Kickstarter and was released during the annual Vegas Valley Comic Book Festival. Lamug's digital painting also placed first-runner up in the Vegas Valley Book Festival Badge Art Competition.

Underneath the Juniper Tree released in May 2013 a limited edition anthology book, which included artwork from Lamug along with stories and illustrations from other writers and artist.

Lamug's piece "Whale House" was also selected as part of HitRecord's third edition of The Tiny Book of Tiny Stories which was released in the fall of 2013.

Awards and recognitions

2012 – Pinnacle Book Achievement Award Winner (A Box Story)
2012 – National Indie Excellence Book Awards Finalist (A Box Story)
2012 – Literary Classics Children's Book Award for Preschool (A Box Story)
2012 – Moonbeam Children's Book Awards Silver Medalist (A Box Story)
2011 – September – Nevada SCBWI Logo Contest Winner**2012 – ForeWord Reviews Featured Book (A Box Story)
2012 – Children's Literary Classics Seal of Approval (A Box Story)
2011 – November – Vegas Valley Comic Book Festival Art Badge Competition Winner
2011 – September – 2011 BEST OF SHOW – Black White & Night – Art Night
2011 – Underneath The Juniper Tree Magazine Cover Design
2011 – Underneath The Juniper Tree Magazine – Story Illustrations
2011 – SCBWI Bulletin Illustration Selection
2011 – ThinkArt! Caramel Bar Bellagio (Las Vegas, NV)
2011 – One World, Many Stories Illustration Exhibit (Henderson, NV)
2010 – Photographers Forum "Best of Photography" Competition Finalist
2010 – Above Second Gallery (Small Victories Exhibit via booooooom.com), Hong Kong
2010 – Featured on National Public Radio Picture Show
2010 – Featured on Streephers.com
2010 – Enterprise Gallery, Las Vegas Nevada
2009 – Nov 13 College of Southern Nevada: Las Vegas Street Photography Feature
2009 – Los Angeles Center for Digital Art, Group Exhibit
2009 – Cinevegas: Visions of Vegas Photography Feature
2009 – Canada, Photoshowcase.ca Magazine Feature
2008 – College of Southern Nevada Group Show
2008 – Las Vegas, Unscene Photography National Tour Symbolic Gallery
2008 – Nevada Camera Club Group Show
2008 – CityLife: Against All Odds Feature
2008 – Co-Director/Cinematographer Feature: Vegasland
2007 – Writer/Cinematographer Short : Defragged
2007 – Cinematographer Short : Here we go again
2006 – CityLife: Tough Enough Feature
2006 – Co-Director/Cinematographer Feature: Bounce.

Notes

External links
Kenneth Kit Lamug Official Site
Rabbleboy Official Site

1978 births
Living people
American filmmakers
American male writers
American illustrators
Filipino film directors
Filipino photographers
Filipino illustrators
Filipino cartoonists
Filipino emigrants to the United States
San Sebastian College – Recoletos alumni
People from Manila
Writers from Las Vegas